Manju Basu is an All India Trinamool Congress   politician and is a Member of Legislative Assembly from Noapara.

A graduate in humanities and education, she was a school teacher by profession. She entered active politics in 2000 after her husband, Bikash Basu, also a school teacher and a Trinamool Congress activist, was killed in the run up to the election the following year.

She was nominated a Trinamool Congress candidate from Noapara in 2001 and she won the election. However, she lost in 2006 but won again in 2011. In the 2016 General Election she lost the seat again. The Congress candidate Madhusudan Ghosh won the seat.
Again, in 2021 West Bengal Legislative Assembly Election she defeated her nearest rival Sunil Singh of BJP.

References

Trinamool Congress politicians from West Bengal
Living people
West Bengal MLAs 2001–2006
West Bengal MLAs 2011–2016
People from North 24 Parganas district
Women in West Bengal politics
21st-century Indian women politicians
21st-century Indian politicians
Year of birth missing (living people)